The k-rune  (Younger Futhark , Anglo-Saxon futhorc ) is called Kaun in both the Norwegian and Icelandic rune poems, meaning "ulcer". The reconstructed Proto-Germanic name is *Kauną. It is also  known as Kenaz ("torch"), based on its Anglo-Saxon name.

The Elder Futhark shape is likely directly based on Old Italic c (𐌂) and on Latin C. The Younger Futhark and Anglo-Saxon Futhorc shapes have parallels in Old Italic shapes of k (𐌊) and Latin K (compare the Negau helmet inscription). The corresponding Gothic letter is 𐌺 k, called kusma.

The shape of the Younger Futhark kaun rune is identical to that of the "bookhand" s rune in the Anglo-Saxon futhorc.
The  rune also occurs in some continental runic inscriptions. It has been suggested that in these instances, it represents the ch /χ/ sound resulting from the Old High German sound shift  (e.g.  elch in Nordendorf II).

References 

Runes